The 2016–17 Fresno State Bulldogs women's basketball team represented California State University, Fresno during the 2016–17 NCAA Division I women's basketball season. The Bulldogs, led by third year head coach Jaime White, played their home games at the Save Mart Center and are members of the Mountain West Conference. They finished the season 18–15 overall, 8–10 in Mountain West play to finish in seventh place. As the No. 7 seed in the MW Tournament, they advanced to the championship game, where they lost to Boise State.

Roster

Schedule

|-
!colspan=9 style="background:#FF0000; color:#000080;"| Exitbition

|-
!colspan=9 style="background:#FF0000; color:#000080;"| Non-conference regular season

|-
!colspan=9 style="background:#FF0000; color:#000080;"| Mountain West regular season

|-
!colspan=9 style="background:#FF0000; color:#000080;"| Mountain West tournament

See also
2016–17 Fresno State Bulldogs men's basketball team

References

Fresno State Bulldogs women's basketball seasons
Fresno State
Fresno
Fresno